Borocera is a genus of moths in the family Lasiocampidae. The genus was erected by Jean Baptiste Boisduval in 1833.

Species
Borocera attenuata (Kenrick, 1914)
Borocera aurantiaca Viette, 1962
Borocera cajani Vinson, 1863
Borocera madagascariensis Boisduval, 1833
Borocera madinyka Conte, 1909
Borocera marginepunctata Guérin-Méneville, 1844
Borocera mimus De Lajonquière, 1973
Borocera nigricornis De Lajonquière, 1973
Borocera regius De Lajonquière, 1973

External links

Lasiocampidae
Moth genera
Taxa named by Jean Baptiste Boisduval